The Royal Mounted Rides Again is a 1945 Universal film serial.  Adventure serials of this type were popular in the early days of cinema. The serial, often called cliffhangers, would show one episode per week, with an ending that would hide the outcome of an exciting event, sometimes ending with "tune in next week for the exciting continuing saga..", or something along those lines. Actor and popular singing cowboy of the day Addison Randall died during the making of this serial.

Plot
Mine owner Jackson Decker orders his manager to obtain miner Tom Bailey's milling machinery, no matter what the cost. When Bailey is found murdered, suspicion naturally falls on Jackson and his manager. Jackson's son, a Canadian Mountie, is directed to seek out the murderer, or murderers, and bring them to justice.

The Mountie joins forces with a French-Canadian policeman, Bailey's beautiful daughter, and a phony palm reader to learn the truth. The foursome soon discover that there is a secret gold mine, a double crossing casino owner, and a forger at the bottom of the crime.

Cast
 George Dolenz as Constable "Frenchy" Moselle
 Bill Kennedy as Corporal J. Wayne Decker
 Daun Kennedy as June Bailey
 Paul E. Burns as "Latitude" Bucket
 Milburn Stone as Brad Taggart
 Robert Armstrong as Jonathan Price
 Danny Morton as Eddie "Dancer" Clare, Price's dealer
 Addison Richards as Jackson Decker
 Tom Fadden as Lode MacKenzie
 Joe Haworth as Bunker
 Helen Bennett as Dillie Clark aka Madame Mysterioso
 Joseph Crehan as Sergeant Nelson
 Selmer Jackson as Superintendent MacDonald
 Daral Hudson as Sergeant Ladue
 George Lloyd as Kent

Critical reception
Cline claims that The Royal Mounted Rides Again is "pretty close to being the weakest chapter film [Universal] ever made."  An excellent cast was wasted and the story "wandered aimlessly [with] almost no suspense."

Chapter titles
 Canaska [sic] Gold
 The Avalanche Trap
 River on Fire
 Skyline Target
 Murder Toboggan
 Ore Car Accident
 Buckboard Runaway
 Thundering Water
 Dead Men for Decoys
 Derringer Death
 Night Trail Danger
 Twenty Dollar Double Cross
 Flaming Showdown
Source:

See also
 List of film serials
 List of film serials by studio

References

External links

1945 films
1945 adventure films
American black-and-white films
1940s English-language films
Northern (genre) films
Universal Pictures film serials
Films directed by Ray Taylor
Films directed by Lewis D. Collins
Royal Canadian Mounted Police in fiction
American adventure films
1940s American films